Field Hockey was among the sports at the 8th All Africa Games held in October 2003 in Abuja, Nigeria. The play featured both a men's and women's tournament. The winners of each tournament qualified for the 2004 Summer Olympics.

Medal summary

Medal table

Results

Final standings

References

2003 All-Africa Games
All-Africa Games
Field hockey at the African Games
All-Africa Games
2003
2003 All-Africa Games